Latvia is a country in the Baltic region of Northern Europe, one of the three Baltic states. Latvia is a democratic and developed country and member of the European Union, NATO, the Council of Europe, the United Nations, CBSS, the IMF, NB8, NIB, OECD, OSCE, and WTO. For 2014, Latvia was listed 46th on the Human Development Index and as a high income country on 1 July 2014. It used the Latvian lats as its currency until it was replaced by the euro on 1 January 2014.

For further information on the types of business entities in this country and their abbreviations, see "Business entities in Latvia".

Notable firms 
This list includes notable companies with primary headquarters located in the country. The industry and sector follow the Industry Classification Benchmark taxonomy. Organizations which have ceased operations are included and noted as defunct.

See also
 Economy of Latvia
 List of airlines of Latvia
 List of banks in Latvia
 List of supermarket chains in Latvia

References 

Latvia